Kulithalai is a state assembly constituency in Karur district in Tamil Nadu. Most successful party : DMK (7 times). Its State Assembly Constituency number is 137. It comes under Karur Lok Sabha constituency. It is one of the 234 State Legislative Assembly Constituencies in Tamil Nadu, in India.

The Mutharaiyar community and Devendra Kula Vellalar community are the two biggest communities of this constituency with each having around 20% population.

The population of other communities are: 15% Vellalar Gounder of all kinds, 10% Pillaimar, 10% Reddy and 1% Muslims.

In the 2021 MLA election, both DMK and AIADMK candidates were Reddys, but the DMK candidate won.

Madras State

Tamil Nadu

Election results

2021

2016

2011

2006

2001

1996

1991

1989

1984

1980

1977

1971

1967

1962

1957

References 

 

Assembly constituencies of Tamil Nadu
Karur district